Brands is a Dutch and Low Saxon patronymic surname. Brand is a short version of names ending in -brand, like Hildebrand and IJsbrand. Notable people with the surname include:

Daniel Brands (born 1987), German tennis player
Eugène Brands (1913–2002), Dutch painter
Frans Brands (1940–2008), Belgian cyclist
Gunnar Brands (born 1956), German classical scholar and archaeologist
Hal Brands (born 1983), American historian, son of H.W. Brands
H. W. Brands (born 1953), American historian (University of Texas)
Kevin Brands (born 1988), Dutch footballer
Stefan Brands (born ca. 1970), Dutch cryptographer
Terry Brands (born 1968), American sport wrestler
Tom Brands (born 1968), American sport wrestler and coach
X Brands (1927–2000), American actor

See also
Ernie Brandts (born 1956), Dutch football defender and manager
Brandts Buys, a family of Dutch musicians
Brand (surname)
Brandt (name)

References

Dutch-language surnames
Patronymic surnames

de:Brands
fr:Brands
ru:Брандс